Calloose is a hamlet near Leedstown in west Cornwall, England, UK.

References

Hamlets in Cornwall